Mary White may refer to:

People 
Mary White (ceramicist and calligrapher) (1926–2013), UK and Germany
Mary White (classicist) (1908–1977), Canadian classicist and university professor
Mary White (designer) (1912–1981), Australian designer and crafts adviser
Mary White (Fianna Fáil politician) (born 1944), Irish Fianna Fáil party politician
Mary White (Green Party politician) (born 1948), Irish Green Party politician
Mary White (physician) (1925–2017), English physician
Mary White (textile designer) (born 1926), English textile designer
Mary Daisy White (1873-1958), American politician and business owner
Mary deLuce White, American stage actress better known as Mary Hall 
Mary E. White (1926–2018), Australian paleobotanist 
Mary Jo White (born 1947), attorney for the Southern District of New York
Mary Jo White (Pennsylvania politician) (born 1941), member of the Pennsylvania State Senate
Mary Louisa White (1866–1935), British composer, pianist, and educator
Mary White Rowlandson (c. 1637–1711), colonial American woman writer of a captivity narrative
G.C. Mary White (died 1944), Canadian journalist known as Bride Broder
Mary White (1905–1921), daughter of newspaper editor William Allen White, subject of the 1977 film
Mary White, former Australian national netball captain

Others 
Mary White (film), a 1977 TV movie
Mary White (lifeboat), a lifeboat based in Broadstairs, Kent, England

White, Mary